Young Socialists has been the name of more than one group:

 Young Socialists (Belgium)
 Young Socialists (Croatia)
 Young Socialists (Flanders)
 Young Socialists (France)
 Young Socialists (Germany)
 Young Socialists (Netherlands)
 Young Socialists (Poland)
 Young Socialists (Sweden)
 Young Socialists (UK) and its successor Labour Party Young Socialists
 Young Socialists (UK, 1966), affiliated to the Workers Revolutionary Party.
 Young Socialists (US), affiliated to the Socialist Workers Party.

See also 
 Young European Socialists (ECOSY)
 International Union of Socialist Youth (IUSY)

Political party disambiguation pages